Bjarne Pettersen can refer to:

 Bjarne Pettersen (footballer)
 Bjarne Pettersen (gymnast)